2007 in cyclo-cross may refer to:

 2007 in men's cyclo-cross
 2007 in women's cyclo-cross